Njube Sundowns is a Zimbabwean football team in the Zimbabwe Premier Soccer League (ZPSL). They play their home matches in Gwanda.

Current squad 
		

Gwanda
Football clubs in Zimbabwe